An inconsistent triad consists of three propositions of which at most two can be true. For example:

 Alice loves me.
 If Alice loves me, then she would have sent flowers.
 Alice has not sent flowers.

If one finds oneself believing all three propositions of an inconsistent triad, then (in order to be rational) one must give up or modify at least one of those beliefs. Maybe Alice doesn't love me, or maybe she wouldn't send flowers to me if she did, or maybe she actually has sent flowers.

Any inconsistent triad } gives rise to a trilemma }}.

Perception and objects 
The dialectical framework for the whole discussion of the problem in the philosophy of perception and the theoretical conception of perceptual experience is set out as an inconsistent triad.

 Physical objects are mind-independent.
 Physical objects are the direct objects of perception.
 The direct objects of perception are mind-dependent.

The first proposition is defended by realists, while being rejected by anti-realists or idealists.

The problem of evil 

The problem of evil is often given in the form of an inconsistent triad. For example, J. L. Mackie gave the following three propositions:

 God is omnipotent
 God is omnibenevolent
Evil exists

Mackie argued that these propositions were inconsistent, and thus, that at least one of these propositions must be false. Either:
 God is omnipotent and omnibenevolent, and evil does not exist.
 God is omnipotent, but not omnibenevolent; thus, evil exists by God's will.
 God is omnibenevolent, but not omnipotent; thus, evil exists, but it is not within God's power to stop it (at least not instantaneously).

Many responses have been made to the problem of evil, including the proposition that evil exists as a consequence of a greater good, such as free will; that evil is an illusion; and that evil is necessary for spiritual growth.

See also 
 Reductio ad absurdum
 Trilemma

References 

 Howard-Snyder, F., Howard-Snyder, D., & Wasserman, R. (2009). The Power of Logic (4th Edition). New York: McGraw-Hill. (p. 336)  

Syllogistic fallacies
Theodicy